Definitive Swim is a free download album released in 2007 by Adult Swim and Definitive Jux (through Williams Street Records).

Track listing
Camu Tao – "Plot For A Little" (Clean) (2:55)	
EL-P – "Smithereens (Stop Crying)" (Clean) (4:34)	
Rob Sonic – "Brand New Vandals" (Clean Edit) (3:53)	
Hangar 18 – "Think Big" (Clean) (3:35)	
Mr. Lif & Cannibal Ox – "Brothas Remix" (Clean) (5:13)	
Despot – "Get Rich Or Try Dying" (Clean) (4:09)	
Cool Calm Pete – "Get With The Times" (Clean) (4:06)	
Mr. Lif – "Red October" (Clean) (2:48)	
Cage – "Blood Boy" (Clean) (4:11)	
Aesop Rock – "None Shall Pass" (Clean) (4:03)

References

Albums free for download by copyright owner
Adult Swim albums
Williams Street Records compilation albums
Definitive Jux compilation albums
Albums produced by El-P
East Coast hip hop compilation albums